William Dalton may refer to:

 William Dalton (author) (1821–1875), English author
 William M. Dalton (1866–1894), Old West outlaw, co-leader of the Wild Bunch gang
 Bill Dalton (footballer) (1876–1955), Australian rules footballer
 William Julian Dalton (1883–1941), American silent film actor, better known as Julian Eltinge
 William S. Dalton, current President and CEO of the H. Lee Moffitt Cancer Center and Research Institute.
 Will Dalton, lacrosse player
 William Dalton (Lucky Luke), fictional character from Lucky Luke
 Bill Dalton, the writer of the Indonesia Handbook
 William Boyd Dalton (1870–1946), Irish international footballer